Runkeeper is a GPS fitness-tracking app for iOS and Android launched in 2008. In late 2011, Runkeeper secured $10 million in a Series B financing, led by Spark Capital. In February 2016, Runkeeper was acquired by ASICS.

Functions 
Runkeeper's main function is to track fitness activities such as walking, running and cycling using the device's GPS sensor. Once an activity is completed, Runkeeper provides basic statistics of that activity. Periodically, Runkeeper offers a Runkeeper Challenge, which requires completing a specific workout within a set time limit.

Runkeeper offers a premium subscription plan.

Criticism and controversy 
In May 2016, the Runkeeper software came to the attention of the Norwegian Consumer Council for breaching European data protection laws. It is alleged to continue tracking user's locations after the application is terminated and to share this information with advertisers in ways that exceed the bounds of the application's terms and conditions.

See also 
 AllTrails
 Health (Apple)
 Endomondo
 Google Fit
 Strava

References

External links 
 

Asics
Fitness apps
GPS sports tracking applications
Mobile social software
IOS software
WatchOS software
Android (operating system) software
2016 mergers and acquisitions